The Arrondissement of Sint-Niklaas is one of the six administrative arrondissements in the Province of East Flanders, Belgium.

The Administrative Arrondissement of Sint-Niklaas consists of the following municipalities:
 Beveren
 Kruibeke
 Lokeren
 Sint-Gillis-Waas
 Sint-Niklaas
 Stekene
 Temse

Sint-Niklaas